The 2010–11 Quaid-e-Azam Trophy was one of two first-class domestic cricket competitions that were held in Pakistan during the 2010–11 season. It was the 53rd edition of the Quaid-e-Azam Trophy, contested by 22 teams representing regional cricket associations and departments, and was followed in the schedule by the Pentangular Cup, contested by five teams representing the four provinces and the federal areas.

There was a change in format for the Quaid-e-Azam Trophy from the previous season, with the teams being split into two divisions: the six best regions and departments from 2009–10 in Division One and the remaining ten teams, seven regions and three departments, in Division Two. At the end of the season, the lowest ranked region and department in division one department were relegated to division two, with the top ranked region and department on division two being promoted; in addition, the lowest ranked department in division two was relegated into the Patron's Trophy (Grade II) competition for 2011–12. Each division was played in a round-robin of four-day matches starting on 23 October 2010, with five-day finals between the top two teams to determine the winners.

Habib Bank Limited beat Pakistan International Airlines by 5 wickets in the Division One final to win the trophy. It was the first time the Quaid-e-Azam Trophy had been decided in a day/night match. Four players were fined for a variety of offences during the final, including the use of abusive language and ball tampering. State Bank of Pakistan won the Division Two final on first innings scores after the match was extended to a seventh day in order to achieve a result; no play had been possible on the first and fourth days due to rain, and the sixth day was lost when Salman Taseer, the Governor of Punjab, was assassinated.

Division standings
The top teams in each division (highlighted) advanced to the finals.

Finals

Division Two

Division One

Notes

References

External links
 Division One Series home at ESPN Cricinfo
 Division Two Series home at ESPN Cricinfo

Domestic cricket competitions in 2010–11
2010 in Pakistani cricket
2011 in Pakistani cricket
Pakistani cricket seasons from 2000–01
2010–11 Quaid-e-Azam Trophy